172nd meridian can refer to:

172nd meridian east, a line of longitude east of the Greenwich Meridian
172nd meridian west, a line of longitude west of the Greenwich Meridian